Delaware County is a county located in the U.S. state of Oklahoma. As of the 2010 census, the population was 41,487. Its county seat is Jay. The county was named for the Delaware Indians, who had established a village in the area prior to the Cherokees being assigned to relocate to Indian Territory in the 1830s. Delaware County was created in 1907. Prior to becoming Delaware County, a large portion of the area was known as the Delaware District of the Cherokee Nation. Today, Delaware County continues to be recognized by the Cherokee Nation as the Delaware District.

History
Archaeological studies have shown that at least three different periods of prehistoric people had lived in the area covered by Delaware County. These included 23 Archaic, 17 Woodland, and 63 Eastern Villager sites. Artifacts date back between 1400 and 2000 years from the present. Many of these sites have been submerged since the creation of Grand Lake o' the Cherokees.

Few Native Americans lived in the area until the early nineteenth century, when the federal government began relocating tribes from the Eastern United States. About 1820, a group of Delaware, who had allied with the Cherokee against the Osage, settled Delaware Town, about two miles south of the present town of Eucha. In 1828, the Western Cherokee moved from Arkansas Territory into the area just south of the present Delaware County. In 1832, the Seneca moved from Ohio into an area that included the northeastern part of Delaware County.

The present day county was created at statehood in 1907. Initially, Grove, the only incorporated town in the county, was designated as the county seat. However, a large number of county residents wanted a more centrally located seat. This group founded the town of Jay, where they built a wooden courthouse and won an election to move the county seat. A court suit resolved the dispute in favor of the Jay location.

Geography
The county lies on the western slope of the Ozark Plateau. There are no oil, gas or mineral resources of economic consequence, but the county has abundant water.

Lake Eucha, a man-made reservoir on Spavinaw Creek, completed in 1952, lies primarily within Delaware County. Grand Lake o' the Cherokees, completed in 1940, and Lake Spavinaw, completed in 1924, are partly within Delaware County. The Neosho River and the Elk River drain the northern part of the county, while Flint Creek and the Illinois River drain the southern part.

Major highways
  U.S. Highway 59
  U.S. Highway 60
  U.S. Highway 412
  State Highway 10
  State Highway 20
  State Highway 25
  State Highway 28

Adjacent counties
 Ottawa County (north)
 Benton County, Arkansas (east)
 Adair County (south)
 Cherokee County (south)
 Mayes County (west)
 Craig County (northwest)

Demographics

As of the 2010 census, there were 41,487 people, up from 37,077 people in 2000. In 2000, there were 14,838 households, and 10,772 families residing in the county. The population density was 50 people per square mile (19/km2).  There were 22,290 housing units at an average density of 30 per square mile (12/km2).  The racial makeup of the county was 70.22% White, 0.13% Black or African American, 22.31% Native American, 0.17% Asian, 0.04% Pacific Islander, 0.59% from other races, and 6.53% from two or more races. Self-identified Hispanic or Latino Americans made up 1.75% of the population. 93.8% spoke English, 3.5% Cherokee and 2.3% Spanish as their first language.

There were 14,838 households, out of which 29.00% had children under the age of 18 living with them, 59.50% were married couples living together, 8.90% had a female householder with no husband present, and 27.40% were non-families. 24.00% of all households were made up of individuals, and 11.20% had someone living alone who was 65 years of age or older. The average household size was 2.46 and the average family size was 2.89.

In the county, the population was spread out, with 24.50% under the age of 18, 6.90% from 18 to 24, 24.40% from 25 to 44, 26.70% from 45 to 64, and 17.50% who were 65 years of age or older.  The median age was 41 years. For every 100 females there were 96.50 males.  For every 100 females age 18 and over, there were 93.80 males.

The median income for a household in the county was $27,996, and the median income for a family was $33,093. Males had a median income of $25,758 versus $19,345 for females. The per capita income for the county was $15,424.  About 14.10% of families and 18.30% of the population were below the poverty line, including 27.40% of those under age 18 and 11.60% of those age 65 or over.

Politics

Communities

Cities
 Grove
 Jay

Towns
 Bernice
 Colcord
 Kansas
 Oaks
 West Siloam Springs

Census-designated places

 Brush Creek
 Bull Hollow
 Butler
 Cayuga
 Cleora
 Cloud Creek
 Copeland
 Deer Lick
 Dennis
 Dodge
 Dripping Springs
 Drowning Creek
 Flint Creek
 Indianola
 Kenwood
 Leach
 New Eucha
 Oak Hill-Piney
 Old Eucha
 Rocky Ford
 Sycamore
 Tagg Flats
 Twin Oaks
 White Water
 Zena

Other unincorporated communities
 Chloeta
 Eucha

NRHP sites
Delaware County, together with Ottawa County to the north, has a large impact on tourism in Oklahoma.  Said counties combined are the third-largest tourism destination in the state, following only the Oklahoma City and Tulsa metropolitan areas.

The following sites are in Delaware County are listed on the National Register of Historic Places:
 Bassett Grove Ceremonial Grounds, Grove
 Beattie's Prairie, Jay
 Corey House/Hotel, Grove
 Hildebrand Mill, Siloam Springs
 Polson Cemetery,  Jay
 Saline Courthouse, Rose
 Splitlog Church, Grove

References

External links
 Encyclopedia of Oklahoma History and Culture - Delaware County
 Oklahoma Digital Maps: Digital Collections of Oklahoma and Indian Territory

 
1907 establishments in Oklahoma
Populated places established in 1907